Sidney Jeanne Flanigan (born October 19, 1998) is an American actress and singer-songwriter. Flanigan made her acting debut with the acclaimed independent drama film Never Rarely Sometimes Always (2020), for which she received nominations for the Critics' Choice Movie Award for Best Actress and the Independent Spirit Award for Best Female Lead.

Biography

Flanigan was born in Buffalo, New York, and describes herself as a nonbinary woman who uses she/they pronouns. In 2020, she made her acting debut portraying Autumn in the film Never Rarely Sometimes Always, directed by Eliza Hittman. The film had its world premiere at the Sundance Film Festival on January 24, 2020. It was also selected to compete for the Golden Bear in the main competition section at the 70th Berlin International Film Festival, where it won the Silver Bear Grand Jury Prize. Flanigan met Hittman when she was 14 and her boyfriend was staying at a communal home shared by juggalos, where Hittman and director Scott Cummings were filming the documentary Buffalo Juggalos. In addition to her acting career, Flanigan is a recording musician who performs both solo and with the band Starjuice.

In December 2020, it was announced that Flanigan would star in Matthew Kaundart’s psychological drama My Twin Is Dead. In March 2021, she also committed to star in Rounding, directed by Saint Frances director Alex Thompson. The film premiered at the 2022 Tribeca Film Festival. She is also set to lead the indie thriller Only the Good Survive, from writer-director Dutch Southern.

Filmography

Awards and nominations

References

External links

Official site for Starjuice - Sidney's band

American film actresses
Living people
21st-century American actresses
American women singer-songwriters
21st-century American women singers
21st-century American singers
Actresses from Buffalo, New York
Musicians from Buffalo, New York
Singer-songwriters from New York (state)
American non-binary actors
1998 births